Lorenzo Dow Danford (October 18, 1829 – June 19, 1899) was an American lawyer and politician who served five terms as a U.S. Representative from Ohio from 1873 to 1879 and again from 1895 to 1899.

Biography 
Born in Washington Township, Belmont County, Ohio, Danford attended the common schools and a college at Waynesburg, Pennsylvania, for two years.
He studied law.
He was admitted to the bar at St. Clairsville, Belmont County, Ohio, in September 1854, and commenced practice there.
He served as presidential elector on the American Party ticket in 1856.
He served as prosecuting attorney of Belmont County from 1857 to 1861, when he resigned to enlist in the Fifteenth Regiment, Ohio Volunteer Infantry, as a private.
Commissioned a lieutenant and later a captain, he served until honorably discharged in August 1864.
He resumed the practice of his profession in St. Clairsville.

Presidential elector for Lincoln/Johnson in 1864.

Danford was elected as a Republican to the Forty-third, Forty-fourth, and Forty-fifth Congresses (March 4, 1873 – March 3, 1879) representing Ohio's 16th Congressional District.
He was not a candidate for renomination in 1878.
He resumed the practice of his profession.

Presidential elector in 1892 for Harrison/Reid.

Danford was elected to the Fifty-fourth, Fifty-fifth, and Fifty-sixth Congresses and served from March 4, 1895, until his death in St. Clairsville, Ohio, June 19, 1899.
He served as chairman of the Committee on Immigration and Naturalization (Fifty-fifth Congress).
Lorenzo Danford was interred in the Methodist Cemetery in St. Clairsville, Ohio on Newell Avenue behind the Court House. His second wife Mary (Adams) Danford is buried next to him.

Mr. Danford was first married on October 7, 1858, to Annie H. Cook, of Jefferson County, Ohio, who died October 24, 1867. On October 27, 1870, he was married to Mary M. Adams, of St. Clairsville.

See also
List of United States Congress members who died in office (1790–1899)

Sources

External links

1829 births
1899 deaths
People from Belmont County, Ohio
Union Army officers
People of Ohio in the American Civil War
1892 United States presidential electors
Ohio lawyers
County district attorneys in Ohio
Waynesburg University alumni
1864 United States presidential electors
19th-century American politicians
19th-century American lawyers
Republican Party members of the United States House of Representatives from Ohio